Lorenzo Monaco (1370 – 1425) was an Italian painter of the late Gothic to early Renaissance age. He was born Piero di Giovanni in Siena, Italy. Little is known about his youth, apart from the fact that he was apprenticed in Florence. He was influenced by Giotto and that artist's followers Spinello Aretino and Agnolo Gaddi.

Life
In 1390, Piero di Giovanni joined the Camaldolese monastery of Santa Maria degli Angeli. He was thenceforth generally known as Lorenzo Monaco ('Lawrence the Monk').  

Starting from around 1404, his works show the influence of the International Gothic, of Lorenzo Ghiberti's earliest works and of Gherardo Starnina. From this period is the Pietà in the Galleria dell'Accademia in Florence. His works, often over a gilded background, showed in general a spiritual value, and usually did not feature profane elements.

In 1414, he painted the Coronation of the Virgin (now at the Uffizi), characterized by a great number of saints and brilliant colours. In the late part of his life, Lorenzo did not accept the early Renaissance innovations introduced by artists such as Masaccio and Brunelleschi. This is visible in the Adoration of the Magi of 1420–1422, where the now widespread geometrical perspective is totally absent. Lorenzo's works remained popular in the 1420s, as testified by the numerous commissions he received, such as the Stories of the Virgin in the Bartolini Salimbeni Chapel of Santa Trinita, one of his few frescoes.

Giorgio Vasari includes a biography of Lorenzo Monaco in his Lives. According to Vasari, he died from an unidentified infection, perhaps gangrene or a tumour.

Selected works
His works include:
Coronation of the Virgin (1388–1390), Courtauld Gallery, London
Madonna and Child with Saints (1395–1402)
Episodes in the Life of Saint Benedict (c. 1407–1409)
Nativity (1409), a panel believed to form part of a predella
Coronation of the Virgin (1414), also for Santa Maria degli Angeli
Annunciation Triptych (1410–1415), Galleria dell'Accademia, Florence
Bartolini Salimbeni Chapel (1410–1415), Santa Trinita, Florence
Adoration of the Magi (1422), Uffizi, Florence
Beheading of St Paul, Princeton University Art Museum
Processional Cross, Chicago Art Institute
Crucifixion of St Peter, Walters Art Museum, Baltimore
Madonna and Child, National Gallery, Washington, D.C.
Madonna of Humility, Treasure Museum of the Basilica of Saint Francis, Assisi
Virgin and Child, Scottish National Gallery, Edinburgh

Paintings

See also
Sienese School

References

Further reading
 (see index; plates 71-72)

External links

National Gallery of Art
Biography and works 
Italian Paintings: Florentine School, a Metropolitan Museum of Art collection catalog containing information about Lorenzo Monaco and his works (see pages 62–68).

1370s births
1420s deaths
People from Siena
14th-century Italian painters
International Gothic
Italian male painters
15th-century Italian painters
Painters from Tuscany
Gothic painters
Catholic painters